"That Is Where I'll Go" is the debut single from singer Sibel Redžep. The song, written by Christian Antblad with strings from the Scandinavian Strings Orchestra, was Sibel Redžep's entry in Melodifestivalen 2008, the Swedish national contest which decides their Eurovision entry. The song did not win but did advance to the grand final. On 27 April 2008, the song was tested for Svensktoppen, but failed to enter.

Track listing 
 "That Is Where I'll Go"
 "That Is Where I'll Go" (Instrumental)

Chart performance 
The single was released on 5 March 2008. It stayed on the official Swedish charts for a total of nine weeks, from 13 March to 8 May 2008, peaking at number six on April 3.

Song credits 
 Music, lyrics, production, and mixing: Chris Antblad
 Publisher: Warner/Chappell Music Scandinavia AB (STIN)
 Guitar: Cem Köksal
 String arrangement: Dan Evmark
 String recording: Tobias Lindell
 String performance: Scandinavian Strings Orchestra
 Backing vocals: Caroline Antblad, Chris Antblad

Charts

References 

Melodifestivalen songs of 2008
Sibel Redžep songs
2008 singles
2008 songs
Warner Records singles